Chetopa may refer to:

Chetopa, Kansas, a city in LaBette County, Kansas
Chetopa Creek, a stream in Kansas
Chetopa Township, Wilson County, Kansas